G.B.O.H. (Gangster Bitches on Heroin) is the debut EP by Riverfenix, released in 1996 on Fuzzgun Records. It has been out of print for some time.

Track listing
(all songs written by Riverfenix, now known as Fenix TX)
"Minimum Wage" – 2:18
"Telefornication" – 2:25
"G.B.O.H." – 3:23
"Philosophy" – 2:24
"O'Bleek" – 3:31
"Skinhead Jessie" – 3:09

Personnel
Damon DeLaPaz (credited as M.C. Treefrog) – guitar, vocals
Adam Lewis (credited as Brother Quaddell Hicks) – bass
Donnie Reyes (credited as El Gordo) – drums, vocals
Will Salazar (credited as Chato Smooth) – guitar, vocals

References

Fenix TX albums
1996 debut EPs